Sultan Sulaiman Badrul Alam Shah ibni Almarhum Sultan Zainal Abidin III (1 December 1895 – 25 September 1942) was the fourteenth Sultan of Terengganu from 21 May 1920 to 25 September 1942.

Life

Sultan Sulaiman Badrul Alam Shah was born as Tengku Sulaiman Shah on 1 December 1895 at Istana Maziah, Kuala Terengganu. He was the third son of Sultan Zainal Abidin III of Terengganu with his second wife, Cik Aisha binti Ismail.

Sultan of Terengganu

Following the abdication of Sultan Muhammad Shah II of Terengganu in 1920, his younger brother, Tengku Muda Sulaiman ascended the Throne on 21 May 1920 as Sultan Sulaiman Badrul Alam Shah of Terengganu.

His reign saw the growth of Malay nationalism in Terengganu. During the 1920s, growing anti-British sentiment in Terengganu led to uprisings in 1922, 1925 and 1928 which were led by Haji Abdul Rahman Limbong. The uprisings was later quelled by the British and the leader was exiled to Mecca, Saudi Arabia, where he died in 1929.

Kesatuan Melayu Muda, one of the most important nationalist organisation in Malaya, was formed during Sultan Sulaiman's reign.

Marriage and children

On 21 July 1911, at the age of 16, Tengku Sulaiman Shah married Tengku Mariam, the daughter of Sultan Ahmad Muad'zam Shah of Pahang. The marriage made the relationship between Terengganu and Pahang closer.

Sultan Sulaiman and his wife had ten children, five sons and five daughter. The eldest was Tengku Ali who succeeded his father as Sultan Ali Shah of Terengganu upon Sultan Sulaiman's death in 1942. The Sultan's daughter, Tengku Asma, was married to Sultan Badlishah who would later become the Sultan of Kedah. Tengku Asma was proclaimed as the Sultanah of Kedah.

Death

Sultan Sulaiman Badrul Alam Shah died on 25 September 1942 at Istana Timur Padang Negara. He was succeeded by his eldest son, Tengku Ali as the Sultan of Terengganu.

He was laid to rest at Abidin Royal Mausoleum, Kuala Terengganu.

Sultans of Terengganu
1895 births
1942 deaths
People from Terengganu
Royal House of Terengganu
20th-century Malaysian politicians